Almaly is a village in the Dashkasan Rayon of Azerbaijan.

References 

Populated places in Dashkasan District